Mohamed Sghaier (born 18 July 1988) is a Tunisian hurdler. He competed in the 400 metres hurdles event at the 2015 World Championships in Beijing getting disqualified in the first round. His personal best in the 400 metres hurdles is 49.22 seconds set in La Chaux-de-Fonds in 2015. This is the current national record.

Competition record

References

External links

1988 births
Living people
Place of birth missing (living people)
Tunisian male hurdlers
Olympic athletes of Tunisia
Athletes (track and field) at the 2016 Summer Olympics
African Games bronze medalists for Tunisia
African Games medalists in athletics (track and field)
Athletes (track and field) at the 2015 African Games
World Athletics Championships athletes for Tunisia
Athletes (track and field) at the 2009 Mediterranean Games
Mediterranean Games competitors for Tunisia
21st-century Tunisian people